is a Japanese professional footballer who plays as a defensive midfielder for J2 League club Cerezo Osaka.

Career
Hinata Kida joined J1 League club Cerezo Osaka in 2017.

Career statistics

References

External links

Profile at Cerezo Osaka

2000 births
Living people
Association football people from Osaka Prefecture
Japanese footballers
Japan youth international footballers
Association football midfielders
Cerezo Osaka players
Cerezo Osaka U-23 players
Avispa Fukuoka players
J1 League players
J2 League players
J3 League players
Japan under-20 international footballers